Sally in Our Alley is a 1916 British silent drama film directed by Laurence Trimble and starring Hilda Trevelyan, Reginald Owen and Mary Dibley. It takes its name from the traditional British song.

Cast
 Hilda Trevelyan as Sally
 Reginald Owen as Harry
 Mary Dibley as Belle Cavendish
 Edward O'Neill as Beauvais
 Wyndham Guise as Squire
 Fred Rains as Steward

References

Bibliography
 Low, Rachael. The History of British Film (Volume 3): The History of the British Film 1914 - 1918. Routledge, 2013.

External links
 

1916 films
British drama films
British silent feature films
Films directed by Laurence Trimble
1916 drama films
Films set in England
Ideal Film Company films
1910s English-language films
1910s British films
Silent drama films